Luca Van Assche (born 11 May 2004) is a Belgian-born French tennis player.

Van Assche has a career high ATP singles ranking of World No. 110 achieved on 6 March 2023. He also has a career high ATP doubles ranking of World No. 344 achieved on 3 October 2022.

Junior Career
Van Assche won the 2021 French Open Boys' Singles title, defeating fellow countryman Arthur Fils in the final.

Professional career

2022: Professional, ATP & Major doubles debuts, Maiden Challenger & top 150 
In January, Van Assche made his ATP main draw debut at the 2022 Open Sud de France after receiving a wildcard into the doubles main draw with Sascha Gueymard Wayenburg.

He made his Grand Slam debut in doubles at the 2022 French Open as a wildcard pair partnering also Gueymard Wayenburg.

In October, Van Assche reached his first singles final on the ATP Challenger Tour in Lisbon, Portugal, entering the main draw as a qualifier and losing to Marco Cecchinato in the finals. As a result he climbed close to 60 positions in the rankings into the top 250 at world No. 231 on 3 October 2022.

In November, he entered the top 200 at world No. 198 after reaching the final of the Brest Challenger losing to Gregoire Barrere and the quarterfinals in Roanne. 
Later in the same month, he reached his third Challenger final of the season and his career defeating Pablo Llamas Ruiz in the semis. He lost in the final in straight sets to Oleksii Krutykh. He moved to No. 176 on 28 November 2022. 
A week later he reached another final at the 2022 Maia Challenger defeating third seed Elias Ymer, Alexander Lazarov, Ivan Gakhov and fifth seed Aleksandar Vukic and moved another 25 positions up to No. 151 in the rankings. He won his maiden Challenger title defeating qualifier Maximilian Neuchrist. As a result he moved to No. 138 in the rankings on 5 December 2022 making him the youngest player in the top 150.

2023: Major singles debut
Van Assche received a wildcard into the 2023 Australian Open main draw to make his Grand Slam debut in singles. 

He then competed in the Teréga Open Pau–Pyrénées challenger, defeating Ugo Humbert in the final in 3 hours and 56 minutes, which set a record for the longest ATP Challenger final. Following his second title win in Pau, he moved close to 40 positions up and reached the top 110 on 6 March 2023.

Personal life
Van Assche has a Belgian father and an Italian mother.
He also has two sisters, Sofia and Elisa, and a brother Paolo.

Junior Grand Slam titles

Singles: 1 (1 title)

ATP Challenger and ITF Futures/World Tennis Tour finals

Singles: 5 (2–3)

References

External links
 
 

2004 births
Living people
French male tennis players
People from Woluwe-Saint-Lambert
Tennis players from Paris
Grand Slam (tennis) champions in boys' singles
French Open junior champions
French people of Belgian descent
French people of Italian descent
Sportspeople from Brussels